The Chemin du Roy (French for "King's Highway" or "King's Road") is a historic road along the north shore of the St. Lawrence River in Quebec. The road begins in Repentigny and extends almost  eastward towards Quebec City, its eastern terminus. Most of the Chemin du Roy today follows along the present-day Quebec Route 138. The modern expressway that replaces both Route 138 and the Chemin du Roy through most of its course is Quebec Autoroute 40.

History

In 1706, the Conseil supérieur (Grand Council) of New France decreed that a road be built to connect the houses along the north shore of the St. Lawrence River, between Quebec City and Montreal. Work began in 1731, under the supervision of Grand Voyer (senior road surveyor) Eustache Lanouiller de Boisclerc, and was completed in 1737. The Chemin du Roy was the longest road in existence at the time in North America north of Mexico.

In 1910, the portion of the Chemin du Roy on Montreal Island was renamed by the District and County of Montreal as Gouin Boulevard. It is no longer considered part of the historic route and does not feature the "Chemin du Roy" route markers that the tourist route now is signed with.

Communities

Modern signed route

 Repentigny (western terminus)
 Saint-Sulpice
 L'Assomption
 Lavaltrie
 Lanoraie
 Sainte-Geneviève-de-Berthier
 Berthierville
 Saint-Cuthbert
 Saint-Barthélemy
 Maskinongé
 Louiseville
 Yamachiche
 Trois-Rivières
 Champlain
 Batiscan
 Sainte-Anne-de-la-Pérade
 Deschambault-Grondines
 Portneuf
 Cap-Santé
 Donnacona
 Neuville
 Saint-Augustin-de-Desmaures
 Quebec City (eastern terminus)

References

 Le Chemin du Roy (official site)

External links
 Le Chemin du Roy (official site)

Roads in Capitale-Nationale
New France
Saint Lawrence River
Historic trails and roads in Quebec
1737 works
1737 in transport
Roads in Mauricie
Roads in Lanaudière
1730s establishments in the French colonial empire